Seaman John Henry Dorman (September 18, 1843 to May 29, 1921) was an American sailor who fought in the American Civil War. Dorman received the country's highest award for bravery during combat, the Medal of Honor, for his action aboard the  during the Battle of Fort Henry on 6 February 1862 and during the Siege of Vicksburg on 22 May 1863. He was honored with the award on 18 April 1864.

Biography
Dorman was born in Cincinnati, Ohio on 18 September 1843. He enlisted into the United States Navy. He died on 29 May 1921 and his remains are interred at the Spring Grove Cemetery in Cincinnati, Ohio.

Medal of Honor citation

See also
List of American Civil War Medal of Honor recipients: A–F

Notes

References

External links
 Naval History and Heritage Command: NH 65477 USS CARONDELET montage

1843 births
1921 deaths
People of Ohio in the American Civil War
Union Navy officers
United States Navy Medal of Honor recipients
American Civil War recipients of the Medal of Honor